Gastrocopta boninensis is a species of very small air-breathing land snail, a terrestrial pulmonate gastropod mollusk in the family Vertiginidae, the whorl snails. This species is endemic to Japan.

References

Molluscs of Japan
Vertiginidae
Taxonomy articles created by Polbot